Edward Campbell may refer to:

People
Edward Campbell (journalist) (1916–2006), British journalist and authority on circuses
Sir Edward Campbell, 1st Baronet (1879–1945), British Conservative Party politician
Sir Edward Campbell, 2nd Baronet (1822–1882), British peer and soldier
Edward Campbell (rugby league) (1943–2015), rugby league footballer of the 1960s and 1970s
Edward C. Campbell (1806–1860), judge and politician in Canada West
Edward Fitzhardinge Campbell (1880–1957), Irish rugby international
Edward Hale Campbell (1872–1946), Judge Advocate General of the U.S. Navy
Edward Kernan Campbell (1858–1938), American judge
Edward Campbell (politician) (1890–1949), Jersey politician

Fictional character
Edward Campbell (Holby City), fictional character from the medical drama Holby City

See also
Ed H. Campbell (1882–1969), U.S. Representative from Iowa
Eddie Campbell (born 1955), Scottish comics artist and cartoonist
Eddy Campbell, Canadian mathematician, university professor, and university administrator
Eddie C. Campbell (1939–2018), American blues guitarist and singer